Molchanov is a Russian male surname. Its feminine counterpart is Molchanova. Notable people with the surname include:

Alexey Molchanov (born 1987), Russian freediver, son of Natalia
Andrey Molchanov (businessman) (born 1971), Russian politician
Andrey Molchanov (swimmer) (born 1987), Olympic swimmer from Turkmenistan
Denys Molchanov (born 1987), Ukrainian tennis player
Ilya Molchanov (born 1997), Russian diver
Kirill Molchanov (1922–1982), Russian composer
Pavel Molchanov (1893–1941), Russian meteorologist 
Viktorin Molchanov (1886–1975), Russian General who participated in the White movement
Yuriy Molchanov (born 1952), Russian businessman and politician
Natalia Molchanova (1962–2015), Russian freediver, mother of Alexey
Olga Molchanova (born 1979), Olympic swimmer from Kyrgyzstan
Stanislav Molchanov, (born 1940), Russian Mathematician 

Russian-language surnames